Christian II (22 June 1637 – 26 April 1717) was the Duke of Birkenfeld-Bischweiler from 1654, the Duke of Zweibrücken-Birkenfeld from 1671, and the Count of Rappoltstein from 1673 until 1699.

Life
Christian was born in Bischwiller in 1637 as the eldest surviving son of Christian I, Count Palatine of Birkenfeld-Bischweiler. After his father's death in 1654 he succeeded him to his territories around Bischweiler. In 1671 he inherited Palatinate-Zweibrücken-Birkenfeld from his cousin Charles II Otto. Through the inheritance of his wife, he was also the Count of Rappolstein from 1673 until he granted that title to his son Christian III.

Marriage
Christian married Countess Catherine Agatha of Rappoltstein (15 June 1648 – 16 July 1683) on 5 September 1667 and had the following children:
Magdalena Claudia (16 September 1668 – 9 December 1704), married to Philipp Reinhard, Count of Hanau-Münzenberg
Louis (26 December 1669 – 2 April 1670)
Elizabeth Sophie Augusta (2 August 1671 – 18 October 1672)
Christina Catherine (2 August 1671 – 15 May 1673)
Charlotte Wilhelmina (18 October 1672 – 29 May 1673)
Christian (7 November 1674 – 3 February 1735)
Louise (28 October 1678 – 3 May 1753), married to Friedrich Anton Ulrich, Prince of Waldeck and Pyrmont

Ancestors

References

Bibliography 
 Maximilian V. Sattler: Lehrbuch der bayerischen Geschichte, Lindauer, 1868, p. 411
 Jahresbericht [nachmals] Trierer Jahresberichte, 1858, p. 58 f. 

Counts Palatine of Zweibrücken
1637 births
1717 deaths
People from Bischwiller
House of Wittelsbach
Soldiers of the Imperial Circles